Margaret Fleming is a 1890 play by James A. Herne.

Margaret Fleming may also refer to:

 Margaret Fleming, Countess of Atholl, alleged witch and granddaughter of James IV of Scotland
 Margaret Fleming, co-owner of Guy and Margaret Fleming House, historic home in California
 Margaret Fleming, wife of Canadian politician, Gavin Fleming
 Disappearance of Margaret Fleming, a 19-year-old Scottish woman murdered in 1999

See also 

 Peggy Fleming, figure skater
 Marjorie Fleming, child writer and poet